Kent Perkins (born November 19, 1994) is an American gridiron football offensive tackle for the BC Lions of the Canadian Football League (CFL).

College career
Perkins played college football for the Texas Longhorns.

Professional career

Cincinnati Bengals 
Perkins signed with the Cincinnati Bengals as an undrafted free agent on May 5, 2017. He was waived on September 2, 2017 and was signed to the practice squad the next day. He was promoted to the active roster on December 22, 2017. On September 1, 2018, Perkins was waived by the Bengals and was signed to the practice squad the next day. He was promoted to the active roster on December 28, 2018. On August 13, 2019, Perkins was waived by the Bengals after announcing his retirement.

St. Louis BattleHawks 
In October 2019, Perkins returned to football when he was drafted by the St. Louis BattleHawks in the 2020 XFL Draft. He had his contract terminated when the league suspended operations on April 10, 2020.

The Spring League 
Perkins was selected by the Alphas of The Spring League during its player selection draft on October 11, 2020.

BC Lions 
Perkins  signed with the BC Lions of the Canadian Football League (CFL) on December 29, 2020. After an injury to veteran offensive tackle Ryker Mathews, Perkins was thrust into the starting role. He thrived in his first season in the league, and was the club’s nominee for CFL Most Outstanding Lineman. Early in the 2022 season, on July 7, 2022, Perkins and the Lions agreed to a new two-year contract extension.

References

External links
BC Lions bio
Texas Longhorns bio
Cincinnati Bengals bio

1994 births
Living people
Players of American football from Dallas
Players of Canadian football from Dallas
American football offensive tackles
Canadian football offensive linemen
Texas Longhorns football players
Cincinnati Bengals players
St. Louis BattleHawks players
The Spring League players
BC Lions players